McAlester may refer to:

McAlester, Oklahoma, an American city in Pittsburg County, Oklahoma

People with the surname
Charles Godfrey McAlester (1765–1847)
J. J. McAlester (1842–1920), American Confederate Army soldier and merchant
Miles D. McAlester (1833–1869), Union general in the American Civil War
Virginia Savage McAlester (1943-2020), architectural historian

See also
McAlester Army Ammunition Plant in McAlester, Oklahoma

Macalester (disambiguation)
McCalister, surname